F-type may refer to:

F-type asteroid, a type of carbonaceous asteroid
F-ATPase, a membrane protein
F-type main-sequence star, a hydrogen-fusing star 
F-type Prisons, high-security prisons in Turkey
MG F-type Magna, six-cylinder-engined car produced by the MG Car company from October 1931 to 1932
Jaguar F-Type, a two-seat sports car manufactured by Jaguar Cars
Renault F-Type engine, straight-4 automobile engine from Renault
Empire F type coaster, a type of prefabricated coastal tanker built in the UK during the Second World War
F connector, a commonly used connector for coaxial cable

See also
F class (disambiguation)
B type (disambiguation)
P-type (disambiguation)